Faina is a municipality in central-west Goiás state, Brazil.

Location and connections
Faina is located 218 km. from Goiânia in the central-west area of the state.  It is part of the Rio Vermelho Microregion. The main access highways are GO-070 Goianira-Itaberaí to the crossroads at Cidade de Goiás, and GO-164.

Municipal boundaries:
North: Araguapaz
South: Goiás
East: Itapuranga
West: Matrinchã

Political data
Eligible voters: 5,981 (December 2007)
Mayor: Caio Vellasco de Castro Curado (January 2009)
Councilmembers: 9

Demographic data
Population density:  (2007)
Population growth rate 2000/2007: -0.99.%
Urban population in 2007: 3,862 
Rural population in 2007: 3,056

Economic data
The main economic activities were cattle raising and agriculture. There were 146,000 head of cattle in 2006. There was modest production of rice, corn, bananas, sugarcane, papaya and passion fruit.

Education and health
Literacy rate: 79.4%
Infant mortality rate: 28.53 in 1,000 live births
Schools: 19 with 2,288 students in 2006 
Hospitals: 2 with 29 beds in 2007 
HDI-M:  0.703
State ranking: 208 (out of 242 municipalities in 2000)
National ranking: 2,945 (out of 5,507 municipalities in 2000)

Tourism
There is also a cavern s deep with several large chambers containing both stalagmites and stalactites.

See also
 List of municipalities in Goiás

References

Frigoletto 

Municipalities in Goiás